Begonia obliqua is the type species of the genus Begonia and the species to which Plumier first gave the name Begonia. It is native to Martinique, Dominica, and Guadeloupe.

The name has been misapplied to Begonia grandis by Thunberg, to Begonia minor by L'Héritier, and to Begonia fischeri by Vellozo.

References

External links
 World Checklist

obliqua
Plants described in 1753
Taxa named by Carl Linnaeus